Jean-Étienne Marie (22 November 1917 – 25 December 1989) was a French composer of contemporary music. He is an important figure in the history and exploration of Microtonal music and electroacoustic.

Biography
Born in Pont-l'Évêque, Calvados, Marie studied at the Conservatoire de Paris with Simone Plé-Caussade. After World War II, he dedicated his life to music. He worked at the Radiodiffusion Française, where he was a specialist in broadcasting contemporary music festival.

Marie was the disciple of Olivier Messiaen and of Darius Milhaud, but this is his meeting with microtonality pioneer Julián Carrillo that was crucial in his musical work. He created le CIRM in 1968 in Paris and set it to Nice in 1978. In 1979 he created the MANCA Festival (Musiques actuelles Nice Côte-d'Azur).

Music

He dedicated most of his work to microtonal and to mixed music. His works and his theorisation in microtonal music were significant in the modern knowledge of European microtonal music.

Like Julian Carrillo, he explored the potential of microtonal scales, either widespread (1/4 tone, 1/3rd tone, 1/6tone) or less known (1/7th tone, 1/5th tone). One of his techniques was to use polytempered music, that is to say music exploiting the simultaneous use of several different microtonal scales. This concept suggested by Carillo. In Tombeau de Carillo he exploited 1/2, 1/3rd, 1/5th and 1/6 tone scales simultaneously.

He also tried to apply serialism to these scales. In 1972 he wrote a serial and polytempered piece Ecce Ancilla Domini, where he uses rows in 1/4, 1/5th and 1/6th tone.

Works

DEUX POEMES DE PAUL ELUARD 1949
SONATE POUR HAUTBOIS SOLO 1950
PIECES VOCALES TROISIEME DIMANCHE DE CAREME 1951
LES CHAUSSONS VERTS 1952
UN GARCON, UNE FILLE, UN CHIEN ET DES ... 1953
POESIES (Schéhadé) 1956
POLYGRAPHIE POLYPHONIQUE n°1 1957-58
PENTHATLE MONOGENIQUE 1958
LA MUERTE DEL TORO 1959
IMAGES THANAIQUES 1960-61
LE CHRIST DANS LA CITE 1962
EXPERIENCE AMBIGUE 1962
POLYGRAPHIE POLYPHONIQUE n°2 1961-63
ACOUSTIQUE PAR L'IMAGE 1965
HOMMAGE A JULIAN CARRILLO 1965
LE TOMBEAU DE CARRILLO 1966
OBEDIENS USQUE AD MORTEM 1966
NOCTURNE MARIN (O'Tamsi) 1967
TLALOC I 1967
APPEL AU TIERS-MONDE 1967-68
LES CAVES DE L'ESPRIT (Nerval) 1968
MIMODRAME 68 1969
S 68 1969
JOIE 1969
BSN 240 1969
CONCERTO MILIEU DIVIN 1969-70
SAVONAROLE 1970
ICH GLAUBE 1971
TOMBEAU DE Jean-Pierre Guézec 1971
ECCE ANCILLA DOMINI 1972
SYMPHONIES 1972
LA PAROLE DE DIEU EST COMME UNE EPEE 1972
UN FANAL POUR MES CANAUX 1972
VOS LEURRES DE MESSE 1972
EMETTEUR DE NORDHEIM 1973
ITHOS 1974
IN MANUS TUAS DOMINE 1975
CRHEODE LAMBDA 1977
COMPLIES A ST-THOME 1977
QUAND ELIE L'ENTENDIT 1977
TOMBEAU DE CESAIRE LEVILLAIN 1978
CHREODE MU 1978
LE CUIRASSE POTEMKINE 1978
OBSERVER 01 1978
OBSERVER n°5 1978
OBSERVER n°6 1979
TROIS ETUDES POUR DEUX PERCUSSIONISTES 1979
FRACTAL FIGURAL III 1980
GRAVURE POLYMORPHIQUE 1980
HEPHAISTOS 1980
TLALOC II 1980
TROIS AFFICHES D'HOLGER MATTHIES 1980
SOLDE POUR UN COMPTE DE NOEL 1981
FRACTAL FIGURAL IV 1981
IRRATIONNELLE HOMOTHETIE 1981
AULOGRAPHIE 1981
LE VIOLENT HARMONIEUX COMBAT 1981
ESPACES DE REVES: I - REPETITION 1981
JE SUIS ALLE A THOARA 1981-82
LES BIJOUX DE CORNELIA 1982
TOPIQUE TOPIAIRE 1982
BIOT HERMES 1983
BONJOUR MONSIEUR LIGETI 1983
LIMONAIRE LITHOGRAPHE 1983
DE L'AMBIGUITE ( Hommage à Evariste Galois ) 1983
SYNFONIETTA 1983
IMPROVISATION II 1983
LIS ABEIHO FASIEN VIOULOUN DE SIS ALETO 1984
SYLVIANA STORY 1984
HOLZWEGE 1984
LABYRINTHE 1985
LIS ABEIHO FASIEN VIOULOUN DE SIS ALETO, version Ballet 1985
SYLVIANA STORY version Ballet 1985
IMPROVISATION III 1985
TOMBEAU DU DOCTEUR DOUADY 1985
MOBILE ALEATOIRE BACH 1986
COJE 1986
EN LIEU ET PLACE DE 1986
PAPA, MAMAN, LA MUSIQUE ET MOI 1986
ARMURES AUX DUITES ENCHAINEES 1987
LES PIRATES AVALAIENT DES COULEUVRES 1987
MARANA THA 1988
TROIS POEMES SANS TEXTE 1988
CONDORCET 1990

References

 Source : Jean-Étienne Marie, biographie (site du CIRM)
 MUSIQUES La mort de Jean-Étienne Marie Le compositeur Jean-Étienne Marie est décédé à Nice, le lundi 25 décembre. Il était âgé de soixante-douze ans, Le Monde. Samedi 30 décembre 1989, p. 15. accédé le 7 octobre 2006.
 Jean Étienne-Marie, L'homme musical, Paris arthaud, 1976

1917 births
1989 deaths
20th-century classical composers
Conservatoire de Paris alumni
French classical composers
French male classical composers
Microtonal composers
Pupils of Darius Milhaud
20th-century French male musicians